"Once Upon a Time" is a song composed by Charles Strouse, with lyrics by Lee Adams, from the 1962 musical All American. It describes the loss of love over time. In the musical, the song was performed by Ray Bolger and Eileen Herlie, and their version appears on the Broadway Cast recording. It has been sung by Eddie Fisher, Bobby Darin, Frank Sinatra, Perry Como, Tony Bennett, Scott Bakula and Bob Dylan among others.

Recorded versions

Ann Austin
Scott Bakula
Christine "Chris" Bennett
Tony Bennett
Ray Bolger
Diahann Carroll
Perry Como
Vic Damone 
Bobby Darin
Peter Duchin
Bob Dylan 
Duke Ellington
Percy Faith
Ferrante & Teicher
Eddie Fisher
Sutton Foster
The Four Tops
John Gary
Robert Goulet
Jason Graae
Ahmad Jamal
Jack Jones
Tom Jones
Howard Keel
Stan Kenton
Keepsake
Steve Kuhn 
Lester Lanin
Ketty Lester
The Lettermen
Al Martino
Maureen McGovern
Jay McShann
Mabel Mercer
Jacob Miller
Lorrie Morgan
Mandy Patinkin
Emile Pandolfi
Frank Patterson
Samuel Ramey
Jim Reeves
Michael Scannell
Frank Sinatra
Kevin Spacey
Clark Terry
Leslie Uggams
Andy Williams
Delroy Wilson
Beegie Adair

References

1962 songs
Songs from musicals
Songs with music by Charles Strouse
Songs with lyrics by Lee Adams
Frank Sinatra songs
Tony Bennett songs
Andy Williams songs
Pop standards
Songs about old age
Songs about nostalgia
Torch songs